Christian Oyakhilome (born 7 December 1963) known as Pastor Chris is a Christian faith leader, preacher, author, philanthropist, televangelist and president of Loveworld Incorporated. He is known globally as the founding pastor of the Mega Church Christ Embassy and author of the most translated and distributed daily devotional in the world, Rhapsody of Realities. He is also known for organizing large crusades, and pulling crowds of over 3.5 million in a single night. His healing school which holds periodically every year in Nigeria and South-Africa attracts thousands of sick people who come to receive divine healing from God from over 70 countries at some instances.

Biography
Pastor Chris was born on 7 of December 1963 to the family of Tim and Angelina Oyakhilome in Edo State, Nigeria. He is the 3rd child of 7 children and 1st of two sons. He has five sisters and all his siblings play active roles in Loveworld and Christ Embassy. They are Beayeta Akhuemokhan (née Oyakhilome), Mercy Oyakhilome,  Kenneth Oyakhilome, Linda Okocha (née Oyakhilome), Kathy Woghiren (née Oyakhilome) and Lovelina Osazuwa (née Oyakhilome).  

He attended Edo College, and on scholarship, gained admission into Bendel State University, which was later renamed to Ambrose Ali University, Ekpoma where he studied and obtained a first degree in Architecture.

Ministry and theology 

Chris Oyakhilome's ministry began to crystallize while a student on campus in Ambrose Alli University. As an undergraduate, he founded a Youth Ministry called Youth For Christ, which  became the largest fellowship in Bendel State University. In one of his services, Chris Oyakhilome gave an account of how the Vice Chancellor at the time attended his service once on Campus.  He later changed the name of student fellowship to Believers Loveworld, known popularly by the acronym BLW began spreading to other higher institutions in Nigeria.

Upon graduation in 1987, he started a Church in Benin-City and relocated to Lagos in 1989, where he fully established Christ Embassy. 

Today, there are BLW Campus Fellowships and Christ Embassy Churches in higher institutions and major cities around the world. 

His ministry holds crusades in the United Kingdom, the United States, Ghana and South Africa, and has "healing school" sessions in South Africa, Lagos and Canada. He was also the first to pioneer a Christian-based television network from Africa to the rest of the world. He also held the largest single night event held in Nigeria in 2006 with 3.5 million people in attendance "Good Friday Miracle Night". Oyakhilome also hosts Higher Life conferences in Nigeria, Ghana, South Africa, UK, US and Canada, and organized the Night of Bliss South Africa event at the FNB Stadium in Johannesburg. Oyakhilome also operates an International School of Ministry, which held one of its Ministers' Network Conferences in 2016 with 5,000 ministers in attendance from 145 countries, in Johannesburg, South Africa.

He runs an online prayer network using social media to send messages to Christians in several countries. He had over 1.2 million followers on Twitter in 2013, over 1.9 million followers on Facebook, and operates a smartphone messenger called KingsChat. In 2015, Oyakhilome was given an honorary doctorate from Ambrose Alli University and Benson Idahosa University. In 2017, Oyakhilome, in partnership with Benny Hinn, created the Christian cable channel LoveWorld USA.

Oyakhilome has hosted several online programs including five editions of the Global Day of Prayer, with Pastor Benny, the first edition on 27 March 2020 having people from many nations of the world in attendance.

Personal Life
February 2, 1991, Chris Oyakhilome married Anita Ebhodaghe. They met as students at  the University. Anita was also a Pastor in Christ Embassy and she was known widely as Pastor Anita. The marriage was blessed with two daughters, Sharon and Charlene.

Pastor Anita filed for divorce on 9 April 2014.  In an official release made by her legal team Attwaters Jameson Hill, the divorce was confirmed completed on the 8th February 2016, and they stated, "Anita Oyakhilome would like to confirm that she is no longer involved in or part of Christ Embassy AKA Believers loveworld inc."

On 6 October 2018, Pastor Benny Hinn officiated the wedding ceremony of Pastor Chris' first daughter, Sharon to Phillip Frimpong; a Ghanaian, with former President Olusegun Obasanjo as chairman of the occasion. 

In 2011, Forbes estimated Oyakhilome's personal wealth as between $30 million and $50 million.

Philanthropic work
Oyakhilome operates the Inner City Mission Project, which works to assist orphaned and indigent children in inner cities in several countries. The organisation is under the auspices of the Chris Oyakhilome Foundation International, which works to help the poor and those in the inner cities. The organisation sends relief materials to countries when disasters strike and works with government parastatals to improve social wellbeing.

The Chris Oyakhilome Foundation is one of the major sponsors of the inner city orphanage homes in Africa managed by pushaboo, an organisation spearheading the care of mothers and babies around the world.

Other agencies supported by Chris Oyakhilome Foundation International (COFI) are the Volunteer Medical Corps, Trauma Care International Foundation, Inner City Mission for Children, Future Africa Leaders Foundation and the Bible for All Mission.

Honors 
Honorary Doctorate in Divinity from Benson Idahosa University.

Honorary Doctorate Doctor of Science Award, Ambrose Alli University.

Controversies

Oyakhilome has also been a target of criticism by the Treatment Action Campaign for his support of faith healing as a supposed cure for HIV/AIDS, and his devotional Rhapsody of Realities has claimed tumors will disappear if rebuked.

Oyakhilome has been accused of preaching the prosperity gospel and using his followers for money, stating that those who donate to his ministry will be rewarded with wealth, health .

Oyakhilome also supports YouTube-propagated conspiracy theories about a "New World Order".

In March 2021, his television network Loveworld was fined £125,000 by British regulators Ofcom after it breached broadcasting rules by airing “inaccurate and potentially harmful claims about coronavirus”.

Writings 
Oyakhilome is the author of several books, including Rhapsody of Realities, distributed monthly in several countries.  Below are the books written and the year published.
 Gates of Zion in 1998
 Your Right In Christ in 1998
 The Oil And The Mantle in 1999
 None of These Diseases in 2000
 When God Visits You in 2001
 The Power of Tongues in 2001
 Join This Chariot in 2002
 Praying the Right Way in 2004
 How To Make Your Faith Work in 2005
 Prophecy in 2005
 How to Make Your Faith Work Good in 2005
 Seven Things The Holy Spirit Will Do For You in 2005
 Holy Spirit And You in 2005
 Now That You Are Born Again in 2006
 The Seven Spirits of God in 2006
 Recreating Your World in 2017
 Your Rights In Christ in 2008
 Healing From Heaven in 2010
 Don't stop here in 2010
 Rhapsody Of Realities Topical Compendium in 2011
 How To Pray Effectively in 2012
 The Power Of Your Mind: Walk In Divine Excellence in 2016

References

External links
 

Living people
Nigerian television evangelists
Nigerian Pentecostal pastors
Faith healers
1963 births
Residents of Lagos
Prosperity theologians